This is a list of years in Myanmar. See also the timeline of Yangon history.  For only articles about years in Myanmar that have been written, see :Category:Years in Myanmar.

Twenty-first century

Twentieth century

Nineteenth century

Eighteenth century

Seventeenth century

Sixteenth century

See also
Timeline of Myanmar history
List of years by country

 
History of Myanmar by period
Myanmar history-related lists
Myanmar